Berninger is a German surname. Notable people of this name include the following:

 Dominique Berninger (1898–1949), French-born American architect
 Edmund Berninger (1843–1909), German painter
 Henry S. Berninger (1864–1934), American politician and businessman
 John Emil Berninger (1896–1981), American landscape painter and Pennsylvania impressionist
 Jules Berninger  (1856–1926), Alsatian architect
 Matt Berninger (born 1971), American singer/songwriter
 Matthias Berninger (born 1971, Kassel), German politician
 Sabine Berninger (born 1971), German politician (Die Linke)

German-language surnames